Madore is a surname. Notable people with the surname include:

Elliot Madore (born 1987), Canadian lyric baritone
Hervé Madore, French slalom canoeist
Joseph Alexandre Camille Madore (1858–1906), Canadian politician
Nelson Madore, American politician
Shelley Madore, American politician

See also
Madore railway station, a railway station in County Cork, Ireland

Surnames of French origin